Allotinus borneensis is a butterfly in the family Lycaenidae. It was described by Moulton in 1911. It is found on Borneo, Peninsular Malaysia, Sumatra and Bangka.

References

Butterflies described in 1911
Allotinus
Butterflies of Borneo